The Super 8 Tournament is an annual professional wrestling tournament held by the East Coast Wrestling Association. The tournament is contested by eight wrestlers in a one-night single-elimination format.

History
The ECWA Super 8 Tournament was first held in 1997 and was won by Ace Darling. The 2011 tournament was broadcast live as an internet pay-per-view for the first time. The 2011 tournament was also the first time the tournament had been held outside of Delaware. Christopher Daniels is the only two time winner.

Winners

Past tournament results

1997
February 22 in Wilmington, Delaware

1998
March 21 in Wilmington, Delaware

1999
February 27 in Wilmington, Delaware

2000
February 26 in Newport, Delaware

2001
February 24 in Wilmington, Delaware

2002
March 2 in Wilmington, Delaware

2003
April 5 in Wilmington, Delaware

2004
April 3 in Wilmington, Delaware

2005
April 9 in Newark, Delaware

2006
April 8 in Newark, Delaware

2007
November 10 in Newark, Delaware

2008
October 25 in Newark, Delaware

2009
October 10 in Newark, Delaware

2010
July 10 in Newark, Delaware

2011
April 30 in Voorhees, New Jersey

2012
April 7 in Newark, Delaware

2013
April 13 in Newark, Delaware

2014
April 5 in Newark, Delaware

2015
March 21 in Woodbury Heights, New Jersey

2016
April 23 in Woodbury Heights, New Jersey

2017
April 29 in Woodbury Heights, New Jersey

2018
April 21 in New Castle, Delaware

2019
April 20 in Philadelphia, PA

2020
September 19, 2020 in Morganville NJ

References

External links
Super 8 website

Professional wrestling tournaments
Events in Delaware
East Coast Wrestling Association
Professional wrestling in Delaware